Live Improvisations is a 1992 collaborative live album of improvised music by English experimental musicians Fred Frith and Tim Hodgkinson. It was recorded in May 1990 in England and was released on Woof Records in the United Kingdom and Megaphone Records in the United States.

Background
Fred Frith and Tim Hodgkinson's first performance together was when they supplied music for a dance recital in 1968 while they were students at Cambridge University. They had never played together before and Frith said "[Tim] had an alto sax, and I had my violin, and we just improvised this ghastly screaming noise for about half an hour." Surprised by their performance, and to keep the momentum going, Frith and Hodgkinson formed a band, which went on to become the English avant-rock group Henry Cow.

Reception

Writing in a review at AllMusic, Rick Anderson described the improvisations of Frith and Hodgkinson on this album as "cacophonic", but added that "none of it is ugly; in fact, much of it is downright lovely". Anderson rated the album as "[h]ighly recommended".

Track listing
All tracks are untitled, composed by Fred Frith and Tim Hodgkinson, and performed in England.

Source: Discogs, Fred Frith discography.

Personnel
Fred Frith – guitar, violin, vocals
Tim Hodgkinson – keyboards, alto saxophone, clarinet
Source: Discogs, Fred Frith discography.

Recording notes
All tracks recorded by Michael Gerzon.
Track 1 recorded on a 4-track
Tracks 2, 3 and 4 recorded on a DAT
Tracks 5 and 6 recorded on a Sony Professional
Source: Discogs.

Footnotes

References

1992 live albums
Experimental music albums by English artists
Live free improvisation albums
Collaborative albums
Fred Frith live albums
Tim Hodgkinson albums
Albums produced by Tim Hodgkinson
Albums produced by Fred Frith